Gafur Sifatovich Mendagaliev (June 2, 1954) is a Soviet and Russian painter, graphic artist, book artist, and sculptor.

Biography 

Gafur Mendagaliev was born in Kamyzyak (Astrakhan region). Graduated from Astrakhan Art School named after Vlasov (1979-1983). Studied painting in A.V. Kondratyev's studio. Member of "Kochevye" group. Participant of over 100 exhibitions in Russia and abroad (since 1987).

The artist's personal exhibitions were presented in St. Petersburg, Paris and Munich (Opera Galerie, Paris, 1993; Galerie Kloska und Vinogradov, Munich, 1995; Galerie im Stiegoibaus, Munich, 1997; Mednis Gallery, 1995; Kaliningrad, 2000; Museum of Urban Sculpture, 2002 (St. Petersburg); Stray Dog Cafe, 2007 (St. Petersburg); Konstantinovsky Palace, National Congress palace, 2008; Diaghilev Center, St. Petersburg State University, 2010 (St. Petersburg); Pushkinskaya 10, 2012 (St. Petersburg); Borey, 2013 (St. Petersburg); Hotel Rachmaninov, 2014 (St. Petersburg); Matiss Club, 2017 (St. Petersburg); Guild of Masters, 2017 (St. Petersburg), etc.

Project member: City as an Artist's Subjectivity (2020).

Lives and works in St. Petersburg (since 1983).

Museum collections
The artist's works are in the following museum collections/ State Catalogue of the Museum Fund of Russiaa:

 Russian Museum. Department of engraving XVIII-XXI centuries. (St. Petersburg)
 National Library of Russia. Department of Prints (St. Petersburg)
 Diaghilev Contemporary Art Museum (St. Petersburg);
 MISP the Museum of 20th and 21st Century St. Petersburg Art (St. Petersburg);
 Museum of Non-conformist Art Pushkinskaya 10 (St. Petersburg);
 Museum of Urban Sculpture (St. Petersburg).
 Yaroslavl Art Museum;
 Mordovian Republican Museum named after S.D. Erzya (Saransk);
 Astrakhan Art Museum;

Bibliography
 Alexey Parygin A City as the Artist's Subjectivity // Book Arts Newsletter. — No. 140. Bristol: CFPR (Centre for Fine Print Research). University of the West of England, 2021, July–August. — pp. 46–48. ISSN 1754-9086
 City as Artist's subjectivity. Artist's book project. Catalog. Authors of the articles: Parygin A.B., Markov T.A., Klimova E.D., Borovsky A.D., Severyukhin D.Ya., Grigoryants E.I., Blagodatov N.I. (Rus & En) — Saint Petersburg: Ed. T. Markova. 2020. — 128 p.

Gallery of works

References

External links

1954 births
Living people
Year of death missing
20th-century Russian painters
21st-century Russian painters
Russian male painters
Russian illustrators
Soviet painters
Artists from Saint Petersburg